David Farr (born 29 October 1969) is a British writer, theatrical director and Associate Director of the Royal Shakespeare Company.

Background
Farr was brought up in Surrey and educated in Guildford and the University of Cambridge (English Literature double first).

Career 
Farr began directing theatre at University and won the Guardian Student Drama Award at the Edinburgh Fringe Festival in 1991 with Slight Possession starring Rachel Weisz. His professional directorial debut came at The Gate Theatre, Notting Hill in 1995 (aged 25) under Stephen Daldry. He was also Artistic Director of Bristol Old Vic from 2002 to 2005 and Lyric Hammersmith from 2005 to 2009.  In 2009, he joined the Royal Shakespeare Company as Associate Director.

He wrote regularly for Spooks for the BBC and is a film writer having co-written the Joe Wright film Hanna, released in 2011. Farr's adaptation of John le Carré's novel The Night Manager was aired in 2016 on BBC1. His first novel, The Book of Stolen Dreams, was published by Usborne in 2021.

Works

Professional productions
The Great Highway, by August Strindberg (The Gate Theatre 1993)
The Boat Plays (The Gate Theatre 1994)
Powder Her Face, by Thomas Ades (Almeida Opera 1995)
The Nativity, by David Farr (Young Vic 2000)
Coriolanus, by William Shakespeare (RSC and London Old Vic winner critics circle, best lead actor Greg Hicks 2003)
A Midsummer Night's Dream (Bristol Old Vic, winner best director TMS Awards 2002)
The Odyssey (Bristol Old Vic 2004)
The UN Inspector, by Gogol, adapted by David Farr starring Michael Sheen (National Theatre 2005)
Tamburlaine, by Christopher Marlowe (The Barbican Centre, London)
Julius Caesar, by William Shakespeare (RSC and Lyric Hammersmith 2005)
Twelfth Night, by William Shakespeare (Royal Shakespeare Company 2012)
Metamorphosis, by Franz Kafka, music by Nick Cave and Warren Ellis (Lyric Hammersmith 2006)
The Birthday Party, by Harold Pinter (50th anniversary production, Lyric Hammersmith 2008)
Water, a collaboration with Filter Theatre (Lyric Hammsermith 2007)
Spyski, a collaboration with Peepolyskus (Lyric Hammersmith 2008)
The Winter's Tale, by William Shakespeare (RSC 2010)
King Lear, by William Shakespeare (RSC 2010)

Playwriting
Elton John's Glasses (Watford Palace Theatre and West End, 1996).
The Danny Crowe Show (Bush Theatre, 2002).
Crime and Punishment in Dalston (Arcola Theatre, 2002 and 2003).
The Queen Must Die (National Theatre, 2003).
Ruckus in the Garden (National Theatre, 2007).
Night of the Soul (Royal Shakespeare Company, 2002).
The UN Inspector (adaptation from Gogol 2006) Faber 2005 and bilingual edition (French/English). Presses Universitaires du Mirail (2008).
Metamorphosis (adaptation from Kafka 2006).
The Heart of Robin Hood (Royal Shakespeare Company 2011/12 season).
A Dead Body in Taos (Fuel, Theatre Royal Plymouth, Warwick Arts Centre, Bristol Old Vic, 2022)

Screenwriting
Spooks (series 4-9)
Hanna (2011)
Outcasts (2011)
The Ones Below (2016)
The Night Manager (2016)
The Man with the Iron Heart (2016)
Philip K. Dick’s Electric Dreams (2017)
McMafia (2018)
Troy: Fall of a City (2018)
Hanna (2019-2021)
The Midwich Cuckoos (2022)

Publications
Plays 1, Faber and Faber (2005). (with cover artwork painting by Andrew Litten).
The UN Inspector, Faber and Faber (2005).
Reamayana, Faber and Faber (2007).
The Heart of Robin Hood, Faber and Faber (2011).

References

External links

1969 births
Living people
Alumni of Trinity Hall, Cambridge
People from Surrey
British theatre directors
British thriller writers
British spy fiction writers
British television writers
British science fiction writers
British male dramatists and playwrights
English dramatists and playwrights
English male dramatists and playwrights
English television writers
English screenwriters
English male screenwriters
British male television writers